The Di Sangro family (or De Sangro) is an Italian noble family.

Origins
The Di Sangro family descends from an Oderisio, who was nephew of Berardo "il Francisco", founder of the Berardi family, known as Conti dei Marsi, who inherited the fief of Sangro from his father Rainaldo (today's Castel di Sangro ), located near the homonymous river, becoming the 1st count in 1093 and, thanks to the Lombard law of the time that allowed to change one's surname with the name of the fief owned, changed its surname to Di Sangro.

History
Exponents of the family held both state and ecclesiastical positions; among those who received the ecclesiastical ones we remember an Odorisio, who was cardinal of Montecassino, a Gregorio and a Gentile, also cardinals, a Consalvo and an Alfonso, bishops, and an Alessandro, Patriarch of Alexandria and archbishop of Benevento; among the state offices belonged to the family twelve councilors of state, eight courtiers, two executioners, four generals, five field teachers and two general commissioners of the army.
The family was also added to the Seggio di Nilo dei Sedili di Napoli.

The Di Sangro family owned a total of 6 principalities, 11 duchies, 6 marquisates, 9 counties and 180 fiefdoms.

Currently there are descendant genealogical lines of Casacalenda, Castel di Sangro, Fondi and San Severo.

Notable members
 Raimondo di Sangro (1710-1771), prince of San Severo, a man of multiple interests, whose name is linked to the Cappella Sansevero, which he designed and commissioned.

References

Bibliography
 Berardo Candida Gonzaga, Memorie delle famiglie nobili delle province meridionali d'Italia, vol. 3, Bologna, Arnaldo Forni Editore, 1875 (pp. 206-218).
 Biagio Aldimari, Memorie historiche di diverse famiglie nobili, così napoletane, come forastiere, Napoli, 1691.
 Filiberto Campanile, L'historia dell'illvstrissima famiglia Di Sangro, Napoli, 1625.
 Giovan Battista di Crollalanza, Dizionario storico-blasonico delle famiglie nobili e notabili italiane estinte e fiorenti, vol. 2, Bologna, Arnaldo Forni Editore, 2011 (pp. 480-481).
 Mario Fiore, I De' Sangro feudatari in Capitanata, Torremaggiore, 1971.
 Rosanna Cioffi, La Cappella Sansevero, Salerno, 1994.
 Scipione Ammirato, Delle famiglie nobili napoletane, vol. 2, Firenze, 1651.
 Scipione Mazzella, Descrittione del Regno di Napoli, Napoli, 1601.

Italian nobility
Italian noble families
Italian families
11th-century establishments in Italy